Natalia Medvedeva was the defending champion, but lost in the second round to Silke Frankl

Amanda Coetzer won the title by defeating Åsa Carlsson 6–1, 7–6(16–14) in the final.

Seeds

Draw

Finals

Top half

Bottom half

References

External links
 Official results archive (ITF)
 Official results archive (WTA)

1994 - Singles
Singles